Beas Sarkar (born 23 December 1979) is a One Day International cricketer who represents India. She represents Bengal Women in India's domestic league. She is a right hand batsman and bowls right-arm medium fast, and has played one ODI.

References

Living people
1979 births
India women One Day International cricketers
Indian women cricketers
Bengal women cricketers
East Zone women cricketers